The Ronald Reagan Trail is a collection of highways in central Illinois that connect villages and cities that were of importance to former United States President Ronald Reagan. The trail was established in 1999 by the Illinois General Assembly, five years prior to former President Reagan's death in June 2004. The Reagan Trail was the brainchild of the late mayor of Eureka, Illinois Joe Serangeli. A volunteer-run Reagan Trail Association maintained a web presence and promoted the trail for its initial years, but the board was dissolved in July 2016 and website transferred to the care of the Ronald W. Reagan Society of Eureka College.

Destinations

The trail takes on the general shape of a triangle, and can be summarized into the following segments:

Monmouth to Eureka

The southwest segment of the trail follows U.S. Route 34 from Monmouth, Illinois to Interstate 74 east to Galesburg, Illinois. It then follows I-74 east to Peoria, Illinois, and U.S. Route 24 east to Washington, Illinois and Eureka, Illinois. This segment has the following attractions:

 Monmouth — Reagan lived in Monmouth from 1918-1919. There is also a separate exhibit in the city.
 Galesburg — Reagan attended the first grade in Galesburg. At some point Reagan also lived in Galesburg.
 Washington — A frequent stop of Reagan when traveling to and from Eureka College.
 Eureka — Reagan went to college at Eureka College, located in the town of Eureka.

Peoria to Tampico/Dixon
The east segment of the trail starts at U.S. Route 24 in Peoria and follows Illinois Route 29 north to Bureau Junction, Illinois. It then follows Illinois Route 26 to Ohio, Illinois where it branches to Tampico, Illinois on Illinois Route 92 and Dixon, Illinois on Illinois 26. This segment has the following attractions:

 Peoria Heights — Contains two visitor's sites not related to Ronald Reagan.
 Chillicothe — Home of one of Reagan's close friends, George Taylor.
 Henry — Home of the trail's national headquarters and Visitor Center.
 Princeton — An antiquing destination and frequent underground railroad stop.
 Ohio — Another frequent stop of Reagan when traveling to and from college.
 Tampico — Birthplace of Ronald Reagan, Tampico Main Street Historic District, and the H.C. Pitney Variety Store.
 Dixon — Boyhood home of Ronald Reagan after age 9. The Dixon Historic Center, First Christian Church, Lowell Park, and the Wings of Peace and Freedom Park are all in Dixon.

Princeton to Galesburg
U.S. Route 34 merely connects Galesburg to Princeton to complete the trail.

See also
Ronald Reagan Memorial Highway

References

External links
 Ronald Reagan Trail official page

 
Historic trails and roads in Illinois
Landmarks in Illinois
Tourist attractions in Illinois
1999 establishments in Illinois